KMCR 103.9 FM is a radio station licensed to Montgomery City, Missouri.  The station broadcasts an adult contemporary format and is owned by Chirillo Electronics, Inc.

History
The station began broadcasting August 15, 1977, and originally held the call sign KVCM. It was originally owned by Montgomery County Broadcasting Company. In 1981, the station was sold to Montgomery Media, Inc. for 160,000. On May 28, 1986, its call sign was changed to KOMC and on December 12, 1986 it was changed to KMCR. The station aired a country music format in the 1980s and early 1990s.

In 1993, the station adopted an adult contemporary format. In 1994, the station was sold to Chirillo Electronics for $40,000.

References

External links
KMCR's website

MCR
Mainstream adult contemporary radio stations in the United States
Radio stations established in 1977
1977 establishments in Missouri